Elections were held in Peterborough County, Ontario on October 27, 2014 in conjunction with municipal elections across the province.

Peterborough County Council
Peterborough County Council consists of two members from each of the county's constituent municipalities.

Asphodel-Norwood

Cavan-Monaghan

Douro-Dummer

Havelock-Belmont-Methuen

North Kawartha

Otonabee-South Monaghan

Selwyn

Trent Lakes

References

Peterborough
Peterborough County